Chuck Jones: Extremes & Inbetweens – A Life in Animation is a 2000 American television documentary film directed by Margaret Selby. The film chronicles the career of legendary Looney Tunes and Merrie Melodies director, Chuck Jones. The film features interviews with Jones himself, as well as animators Matt Groening, Eric Goldberg, and John Lasseter, critics Roger Ebert and Leonard Maltin, film directors Steven Spielberg, Ron Howard, and Joe Dante, and comedians Whoopi Goldberg, Lorne Michaels, Robin Williams, and June Foray, as well as others. The film was originally broadcast as part of the Great Performances series on November 22, 2000 on PBS, and later released to VHS and DVD by Warner Home Video on October 22, 2002.

Interviews

Premise 
The film chronicles the career of legendary Looney Tunes and Merrie Melodies director, Chuck Jones; from his start in the animation industry as a cel washer; to director of shorts starring Bugs Bunny, Daffy Duck, Porky Pig, Elmer Fudd, Pepé Le Pew, Michigan J. Frog, Marvin the Martian, Wile E. Coyote and the Road Runner, Hubie and Bertie, and the Three Bears, among others; the animation process consisting of: storyboards, backgrounds, dialogue, expressions, comedic timing, sound effects, and music; discussions on select Jones films such as The Dover Boys, Duck Amuck, Duck Dodgers in the 24½th Century, The Scarlet Pumpernickel, Dripalong Daffy, Hopalong Casualty, Robin Hood Daffy, Bear Feat, Mouse Wreckers, Rabbit Seasoning, Broomstick Bunny, Feed the Kitty, Long-Haired Hare, High Note, Rabbit of Seville, What's Opera, Doc?, The Dot and the Line, How the Grinch Stole Christmas, and One Froggy Evening, among others; and to his role as an "elder statesman" of animation.

References

External links 
 

American documentary television films
Looney Tunes films
2000 television films
PBS original programming
2000 documentary films
2000 films
2000s American films
2000s English-language films
English-language documentary films